André Schickling or Sharivari is a German professional Pool player. He is currently playing for club Billard Sportverein Dachau in the highest German league, Bundesliga Pool.

Early life

Sharivari used to play pool at an early age with his father. However, he stopped playing pool actively and only resumed at the age of 23. He has been active since then.

Career

Sharivari is professionally playing for Billard Sportverein Dachau in Bundesliga Pool. Earlier, he has won several tournaments and matches in Germany. He is also known for his YouTube channel where he teaches how to play pool.

In 2020, Pools Power 15 named Sharivari as the 11th most influential person in the pool industry. A year later, he was named as the 9th most influential person. In March 2022 he was seen on the front cover of Billiards Digest.

References

Living people
German pool players
1989 births

External links 
 Official website